Mary Kelly Kunesh (born November 20, 1960) is an American politician and member of the Minnesota State Senate. A member of the Minnesota Democratic–Farmer–Labor Party (DFL), she represents District 41, which includes parts of the counties of Ramsey, Hennepin, and Anoka, and the cities of Fridley, Spring Lake Park, Columbia Heights, Hilltop, New Brighton, and St. Anthony.

Early life, education, and career
Kunesh was born in Saint Paul and raised in Sartell, Minnesota. Her mother is an enrolled member of the Standing Rock Sioux Tribe, and her father a former St. Cloud City Attorney, and later Assistant Stearns County Attorney. She graduated from Cathedral High School in St. Cloud, Minnesota. She attended St. Catherine University, graduating with a Bachelor of Arts in elementary education in 1995, and later St. Cloud State University, graduating with a Master of Arts in information media in 2010.

Kunesh was a member and chair of the New Brighton Parks, Recreation and Environmental Commission and was a candidate for the New Brighton City Council in 2013. She works as a library media specialist for Robbinsdale Area Schools, including Robbinsdale Middle School.

Minnesota House of Representatives
Kunesh was first elected to the Minnesota House of Representatives in 2016, succeeding DFL incumbent Carolyn Laine. She is one out of four Native American members of the Minnesota Legislature in her first term. After Carolyn Laine retired from the Senate in 2020, Kunesh campaigned for the Senate seat of the district.

Minnesota State Senate 
In 2020, Kunesh was elected into the Minnesota State Senate winning the general election against Lucia Vogel with over 66% of the vote.

She is currently serving on the following committees:

 Education Finance and Policy
 Redistricting
 Ranking Minority Chair of Mining and Forestry Policy

Personal life
Kunesh resides in New Brighton, Minnesota. She has three children.

References

External links

 Official House of Representatives website
 Official campaign website

1960 births
Living people
Native American state legislators in Minnesota
Native American women in politics
People from Sartell, Minnesota
Politicians from St. Cloud, Minnesota
Politicians from Saint Paul, Minnesota
St. Catherine University alumni
St. Cloud State University alumni
American librarians
American women librarians
Women state legislators in Minnesota
Democratic Party members of the Minnesota House of Representatives
People from New Brighton, Minnesota
21st-century American politicians
21st-century American women politicians